Suzy Carrier (1922–1999) was a French film actress.

Selected filmography
 The Stairs Without End (1943)
 Dorothy Looks for Love (1945)
 Distress (1946)
 Gringalet (1946)
 Not So Stupid (1946)
 Three Boys, One Girl (1948)
 Dakota 308 (1951)
 The Father of the Girl (1953)

References

Bibliography
 Mitchell, Charles P. The Great Composers Portrayed on Film, 1913 through 2002. McFarland, 2004.

External links

People from Moulins, Allier
1922 births
1999 deaths
French film actresses
20th-century French women